Eugaedioxenis is a genus of bristle flies in the family Tachinidae.

Species
Eugaedioxenis haematodes (Villeneuve, 1937)
Eugaedioxenis horridus Cerretti, O’Hara & Stireman, 2015

References

Exoristinae
Tachinidae genera
Diptera of Africa